Cypriot (in older sources often "Cypriote") refers to someone or something of, from, or related to the country of Cyprus.

 Cypriot people, or of Cypriot descent; this includes: 
Armenian Cypriots
Greek Cypriots
Maronite Cypriots
Turkish Cypriots
 Cypriot dialect (disambiguation), the dialects being spoken by Cypriots
 Cypriot syllabary, the ancient syllabic writing system of Cyprus, in use 1100–300 BCE
 Cypriot cuisine

Language and nationality disambiguation pages